RPA may refer to:

Companies
 RPA (Rubin Postaer and Associates), advertising agency, Santa Monica, California, US
 Republic Airways, ICAO code: RPA

Political groups
 Republican Party of Arkansas, the affiliate of the Republican Party in Arkansas
 Republican Party of Armenia, a national conservative political party in Armenia
 Republican Party of Australia, a minor political party
 Revolutionary Proletarian Army, a militant communist organization in the Philippines
 Richmond Progressive Alliance, Contra Costa County, California, US
 Rural Payments Agency of the UK Department for Environment, Food and Rural Affairs
 Rwandan Patriotic Army, predecessor of the Rwandan Defence Forces

Organizations
 Railway Procurement Agency, Ireland
 Rajasthan Police Academy, India
 Regional Plan Association, New York, US
 Register of Professional Archaeologists
 Royal Prince Alfred Hospital, Sydney, Australia
 Rugby Players' Association, England

Media
 RPA (TV series), Australia
 RPA & The United Nations of Sound, a UK band
 Radio del Principado de Asturias, the public radio station of Asturias, Spain

Science and technology
 Random phase approximation, a method in physics
 Remotely piloted aircraft
 Replication protein A
 Recombinase polymerase amplification, isothermal alternative to the polymerase chain reaction (PCR)
 Robotic process automation, a form of business process automation technology

Other uses
 Real Property Administrator
 Registered physician assistant
 Registered Professional Archaeologist
 Request for Public Assistance, a Federal Emergency Management Agency (FEMA) program
 Representation of the People Act, a short title for many legislative Acts in India and the United Kingdom, e.g. Representation of the People Act 1884
 Romanized Popular Alphabet for Hmong language dialects

See also